The 1989 NCAA basketball tournament was the 65th season in the Philippine National Collegiate Athletic Association (NCAA). The season opens on July 30 at the Araneta Coliseum and it ended with the San Sebastian Stags successfully defending their championship in the Seniors division. The year's host was Mapua Tech.

Seniors' tournament

Elimination round
Format:
Tournament divided into two halves: winners of the two halves dispute the championship in a best-of-3 finals series unless:
A team wins both rounds. In that case, the winning team automatically wins the championship.
A third team has a better cumulative record than both finalists. In that case, the third team has to win in a playoff against the team that won the second round to face the team that won in the first round in a best-of-3 finals series.

First round team standings

Second round team standings

Cumulative standings
No other team had a better cumulative record than the two pennant winners, so playoff for the Finals berth was not played.

The Altas of Perpetual Help College of Rizal took the first round flag with a 4-1 won-loss card following Letran's 97-106 loss to San Sebastian on August 26, in which the defending champion Stags tied the Knights with three wins and two losses. 

The second round of the tournament had a four-way tie among Perpetual Help College, San Sebastian, Mapua and Letran. The four teams were paired and the winners clash in a playoff to decide the second round champion. Had the Altas won the knockout series, they will automatically be declared champions.  It turn out the San Sebastian Stags emerge victorious and captured the second round pennant, thus forge a best-of-three title showdown with the Altas.

Finals

See also
UAAP Season 52 men's basketball tournament

References

65
1989 in Philippine basketball